The 2019 Magyar Kupa (known as the BENU Férfi Magyar Kupa for sponsorship reasons), was the 93rd edition of the tournament.

Participating clubs
The following 17 teams qualified for the competition:

Schedule
The rounds of the 2019 competition are scheduled as follows:

Preliminary round
The preliminary round ties were scheduled for 1–2 September 2019.

Group A
Tournament was played at Városi Sportuszoda, Szentes.

Group B
Tournament was played at Abay Nemes Oszkár Sportuszoda, Pécs.

Group C
Tournament was played at Csik Ferenc Versenyuszoda, Kaposvár.

Quarter-finals
The quarter-final matches were played on 25 and 26 October 2019.

|}

Final four
The final four was held on 7 and 8 December 2019 at the Császár-Komjádi Swimming Stadium in Budapest, II. ker.

Semi-finals

Final

Final standings

See also
2019–20 Országos Bajnokság I (National Championship of Hungary)
2019 Szuperkupa (Super Cup of Hungary)

References

External links
 Hungarian Water Polo Federaration

Seasons in Hungarian water polo competitions
Hungary
Magyar Kupa Men